This is a list of the 322 members of the 15th legislature of the Italian Senate that were elected in the 2006 general election. The legislature met from 28 April 2006 to 28 April 2008.

Senators for life are marked with a "(L)".

Democrats of the Left

Democracy is Freedom - The Daisy

Forza Italia

National Alliance

Communist Refoundation Party

Union of Christian and Centre Democrats

Lega Nord
Roberto Calderoli
Roberto Castelli
Michelino Davico
Sergio Divina
Paolo Franco
Dario Fruscio
Albertino Gabana
Dario Galli
Giuseppe Leoni
Ettore Pietro Pirovano
Massimo Polledri
Stefano Stefani
Piergiorgio Stiffoni

Together with the Union

Federation of the Greens
Mauro Bulgarelli
Loredana De Petris
Anna Donati
Marco Pecoraro Scanio
Natale Ripamonti
Gianpaolo Silvestri

Party of Italian Communists
Armando Cossutta
Manuela Palermi
Maria Agostina Pellegatta
Fernando Rossi
Dino Tibaldi

Mixed group

Italy of Values
Aniello Formisano
Fabio Giambrone
Giuseppe Caforio
Sergio De Gregorio
Franca Rame

Union of Democrats for Europe
Stefano Cusumano
Tommaso Barbato
Clemente Mastella

Southern Democratic Party
Pietro Fuda

Per le Autonomie

South Tyrolean People's Party
Oskar Peterlini
Manfred Pinzger
Helga Thaler Ausserhofer

Autonomy Liberty Democracy
Carlo Perrin

Christian Democracy for the Autonomies
Mauro Cutrufo
Gianfranco Rotondi

Movement for the Autonomy
Giovanni Pistorio
Giuseppe Saro

Independents
Luigi Pallaro
Carlo Azeglio Ciampi (L)
Francesco Cossiga (L)
Oscar Luigi Scalfaro (L)
Giulio Andreotti (L)
Rita Levi Montalcini (L)
Emilio Colombo (L)
Sergio Pininfarina (L)

References

List
Lists of political office-holders in Italy
Lists of legislators by term
Lists of members of upper houses